Tobacco bowdlerization occurs when a publisher or government agency expurgates a photograph, text, or video document to remove images and references to consuming tobacco products.  It often occurs in conjunction with traditional restrictions on tobacco advertising, and is most commonly seen on works that are aimed at children.

Famous instances
 In 1984, record label EMI used airbrushing techniques to remove a cigarette from Paul McCartney's hand on the cover of the re-release of The Beatles' "I Want to Hold Your Hand".
 In 1994, a US Postal Service stamp commemorating blues guitarist Robert Johnson used one of the few intact photographs of the musician, which happened to feature him smoking.  Photo editing techniques were employed to remove the cigarette from his mouth.
 The 1998 NTSC video release of the Disney animated feature Melody Time in North America removed several images of Pecos Bill smoking and rolling cigarettes. These scenes were left intact for the British PAL home video release.
 In 1999, the United States Postal Service removed a cigarette from a photograph of artist Jackson Pollock for use in a stamp series.
 The children's book Goodnight Moon featured a photograph of illustrator Clement Hurd smoking a cigarette on the back cover.  In 2005, publishers HarperCollins used photo editing techniques to remove the cigarette from the photograph for the 60th anniversary reprint edition.
 In 2006, when releasing The Capitol Albums, Volume 2 record label EMI removed images of The Beatles' band members smoking from the cover art. Fans were quick to note that in removing the offending object, two of drummer Ringo Starr's fingers were removed as well.
 In 2009, posters of French film star and comic Jacques Tati showed him with a yellow windmill in his mouth rather than his trademark pipe.
 Turner Broadcasting received complaints about smoking scenes in the Tom and Jerry cartoon series, being rebroadcast on their Boomerang channel.  In response, they announced that they would go through their library of cartoons and remove any scenes where smoking was "glamorized".
 The Winston Churchill's Britain at War Experience Museum altered a famous photo of Sir Winston Churchill to remove the cigar he was smoking.
 In a similar manner, pictures of Isambard Kingdom Brunel were censored on at least one occasion to remove his cigar before inclusion in educational material.

Suspected instance
 In 2008, the US Postal Service released a Bette Davis stamp, where the position of her hand led to claims that a cigarette had been removed or eliminated. Michael J. Deas, the artist who painted the stamp image, published a side-by-side comparison of the photo he used and the stamp and replied that "in the original reference photo Bette was not smoking a cigarette. It just ain't so..." Deas then notes that he did change Davis' coat from mink to velvet to avoid an outcry from PETA.
 From 2005 to 2012, the cover design of Looking for Alaska was edited to include a candle, presumably because bookstores did not want to promote juvenile smoking.

Criticism and defense
Some historians and artists have criticized the process.  When speaking of the Jackson Pollock US stamps, New York University professor Todd Gitlin compared the censorship to that used by communist regimes, saying "The communists used to airbrush inconvenient persons from photographs. Americans are airbrushing signs of inconvenient sins." Thank You for Smoking author Christopher Buckley also criticized the practice, claiming that the government was "tampering with cultural DNA".

Others argue that the process is necessary to counteract the overt product placement and influence that the tobacco industry had in broadcasting circles.  In 1998, in early hearings for the Tobacco Master Settlement Agreement, it was divulged that large tobacco companies including R.J. Reynolds and Philip Morris had actively spent over US$1 billion US between 1972 and 1991 to get cigarettes in mainstream movies, and smoked by specific actors. The final settlement quotes the Institute of Medicine, who claim that these placements could be extremely effective on children.

References

Tobacco smoking
Censorship
Censorship of broadcasting